The Calahorra tower (Spanish: Torre de la Calahorra) is a fortified gate in the historic centre of Córdoba, Spain. The edifice is of Islamic origin.

History
It was first erected by the Almohad Caliphate to protect the nearby Roman Bridge on the Guadalquivir. The tower, standing on the left bank of the river, originally consisted of an arched gate between two. A third tower was added to the existing ones, in the shape of two cylinders connecting them.

The tower was declared a national historical monument in 1931.

The restoration of the tower, along with the Roman Bridge, Gate of the Bridge and surrounding area, was awarded the European Union Prize for Cultural Heritage / Europa Nostra Award in 2014.

References 

Berber architecture
Bien de Interés Cultural landmarks in the Province of Córdoba (Spain)
Buildings and structures in Córdoba, Spain
Historic centre of Córdoba, Spain
Towers completed in the 13th century